The 2018–19 North Dakota State Bison men's basketball team represented North Dakota State University in the 2018–19 NCAA Division I men's basketball season. The Bison, led by fifth-year head coach David Richman, played their home games at the Scheels Center in Fargo, North Dakota as members of the Summit League. They finished the season 19–16, 9–7 in Summit League play to finish in a tie for third place. As the No. 4 seed in the Summit League tournament, they defeated Oral Roberts, Western Illinois, and Omaha to win the tournament championship. As a result, they received the conference's automatic bid to the NCAA tournament as the No. 16 seed in the East region. There the Bison lost to overall No. 1 seed Duke.

Previous season
The Bison finished the season 15–17, 5–9 in Summit League play to finish in a tie for fifth place. They defeated Fort Wayne in the quarterfinals of the Summit League tournament before losing in the semifinals to South Dakota State.

Roster

Schedule and results

|-
!colspan=9 style=| Exhibition

|-
!colspan=9 style=| Regular season

|-
!colspan=9 style=| The Summit League tournament

|-
!colspan=9 style=| NCAA tournament

Source

References

North Dakota State Bison men's basketball seasons
North Dakota State
Bison
Bison
North Dakota State